Girolamo Francesco Maria Mazzola (11 January 150324 August 1540), also known as Francesco Mazzola or, more commonly, as Parmigianino ("the little one from Parma"), was an Italian Mannerist painter and printmaker active in Florence, Rome, Bologna, and his native city of Parma. His work is characterized by a "refined sensuality" and often elongation of forms and includes Vision of Saint Jerome (1527) and the iconic if somewhat anomalous Madonna with the Long Neck (1534), and he remains the best known artist of the first generation whose whole careers fall into the Mannerist period.

His prodigious and individual talent has always been recognised, but his career was disrupted by war, especially the Sack of Rome in 1527, three years after he moved there, and then ended by his death at only 37.  He produced outstanding drawings, and was one of the first Italian painters to experiment with printmaking himself.  While his portable works have always been keenly collected and are now in major museums in Italy and around the world, his two large  projects in fresco are in a church in Parma and a palace in a small town nearby.  This in conjunction with their lack of large main subjects has resulted in their being less well known than other works by similar artists. He painted a number of important portraits, leading a trend in Italy towards the three-quarters or full-length figure, previously mostly reserved for royalty.

Early years
Parmigianino was the eighth child of Filippo Mazzola and one Donatella Abbati. His father died of the plague two years after Parmigianino's birth, and the children were raised by their uncles, Michele and Pier Ilario, who according to Vasari were modestly talented artists. In 1515, his uncle received a commission from Nicolò Zangrandi for the decoration of a chapel in San Giovanni Evangelista; a work later completed by a young Parmigianino. By the age of eighteen, he had already completed the Bardi Altarpiece. In 1521, Parmigianino was sent to Viadana (along with painter Girolamo Bedoli who was to marry his cousin) to escape the wars between the French, Imperial, and papal armies. In Viadana, he painted two panels in tempera, depicting Saint Francis for the church of the Frati de' Zoccoli, and the Mystical Marriage of Saint Catherine for San Pietro. He also worked in San Giovanni and met Correggio, who was at work on the fresco decorations of the cupola.

Work in Fontanellato and travel to Rome

In 1524, he traveled to Rome with five small paintings, including the Circumcision of Jesus and his Self-portrait in a Convex Mirror, seeking patronage of the Medici pope, Clement VII. Vasari records that in Rome, Parmigianino was "celebrated as a Raphael reborn". In January 1526, Parmigianino and his uncle, Pier Ilario, agreed with Maria Bufalina from Città di Castello, to decorate the church of San Salvatore in Lauro with an altarpiece of the Vision of Saint Jerome (1526–27, National Gallery, London). Within a year, the Sack of Rome caused Parmigianino, and many other artists, to flee.

Bologna and return to Parma
He resided in Bologna for nearly three years. At around 1528, he painted the Madonna and Child with Saints (Pinacoteca, Bologna), then later in 1528, he painted Madonna con la Rosa (Dresden) and Madonna with Saint Zachariah (Uffizi). By 1530 Parmigianino had returned to Parma.

In 1531, Parmigianino received a commission for two altarpieces, depicting Saint Joseph and Saint John the Baptist, from the unfinished church of Santa Maria della Steccata. The brotherhood overseeing the church advanced him salary and promised him the supplies and materials; however, by 1535, the project was unfinished. In December, he nominated Don Nicola Cassola, a Parman cleric at the Roman Curia, to act as his legal representative. Parmigianino authorized him to collect the 50 gold scudi from Bonifazio Gozzadini for the Madonna with St. John the Baptist and St. Zacharias.

In 1534, it was decided that the Madonna dal collo lungo (the Madonna with the Long Neck) would hang in the chapel of the family of Elena Baiardi.

Parmigianino had probably expected to succeed Correggio in the favour of the church. However, in April 1538, the administrative offices commissioned initially Giorgio Gandini del Grano, then Girolamo Bedoli, to decorate the apse and choir of the Parma Cathedral.

It is believed that at this time, he became a devotee of alchemy. Vasari hypothesizes that this was due to his fascination with magic. Scholars now agree that Parmigianino's scientific interests may have been due to his obsession with trying to find a new medium for his etchings. As a result of his alchemical researches, he completed little work in the church. He was imprisoned for two months for breach of contract after the Confraternita decided unanimously to ban him from continuing in their church. He was replaced between 1539 and 1540 by Giulio Romano, who also promptly withdrew from the contract.

Parmigianino died of a fever in Casalmaggiore on 24 August 1540 at the age of 37 years. He is buried in the church of the Servite Friars "naked with a cross made of cypress wood on his chest".

Among those closely influenced by Parmigianino were his cousin Girolamo Mazzuoli and Girolamo's son Alessandro Mazzuoli; Pomponeo Amidano; Giacomo Bertoia; and Francesco Borgani.

Works

Parmigianino was also an early Italian etcher, a technique that was pioneered in Italy by Marcantonio Raimondi, but which appealed to draughtsmen. Though the techniques of printing the copper plates required special skills, the ease with which acid, as a substitute for ink, could reproduce the spontaneity of an artist's hand attracted Parmigianino, a "master of elegant figure drawing". Parmigianino also designed chiaroscuro woodcuts, and although his output was small he had a considerable influence on Italian printmaking. Some of his prints were done in collaboration with Giovanni Jacopo Caraglio.

Selected works
Baptism of Christ (c. 1519) – Oil on wood, 197 x 137 cm – Gemäldegalerie, Berlin
Bardi Altarpiece (1521) – Tempera on panel, 203 x 130 cm; Church of Santa Maria, Bardi
Saint Barbara (1522) – Oil on Wood, 48 x 39 cm – Prado Museum, Madrid.
Circumcision of Jesus (c. 1523) – Oil on wood, 42 x 31.4 cm; Detroit Institute of Arts
Self-portrait in a Convex Mirror (c. 1524) – Oil on wood, diameter 24.4 cm; Kunsthistorisches Museum, Vienna
Portrait of a Collector (c. 1524) – Oil on panel, 86 x 94 cm,  National Gallery, London
Portrait of Galeazzo Sanvitale (1524) – Oil on panel, 109 x 81 cm, Museo di Capodimonte, Naples
Portrait of Lorenzo Cybo (1524) – Oil on panel, 126 x 104 cm, Statens Museum for Kunst, Copenhagen
Myth of Diana and Acteon (c. 1524) – fresco, Rocca Sanvitale, Fontanellato, Province of Parma
The Holy Family with Angels (c. 1524) – Oil on panel, 110 x 89 cm, Museo del Prado, Madrid.
Antea (c. 1524–7) – Oil on canvas, 135 x 88 cm, Museo di Capodimonte, Naples
Madonna and Child (1525) – Galleria Doria-Pamphili, Rome 
Vision of Saint Jerome (1526–1527) – Oil on panel, 343 x 149 cm, National Gallery, London
Conversion of Saint Paul (c. 1527) – Oil on canvas, 177.5 x 128.5 cm, Kunsthistorisches Museum, Vienna
 Holy Family with the Infant Saint John the Baptist (c.1528) – National Museum of Capodimonte, Naples
The Mystical Marriage of St Catherine (1529) – Oil on panel, 74.2 x 57.2 cm, National Gallery, London
Turkish Slave (Portrait of a Lady; c. 1533) – Oil on panel, 67 x 53 cm, Galleria Nazionale di Parma
Cupid Making His Arch (c. 1533–1535) – Oil on panel, 135 x 65.3 cm, Kunsthistorisches Museum, Vienna
Madonna with the Long Neck (1534–40) –  Oil on wood, 216 x 132 cm, Uffizi, Florence
Portrait of Pier Maria Rossi di San Secondo (c. 1535–1539) – Oil on panel, 133 x 98 cm, Museo del Prado, Madrid
Portrait of Camilla Gonzaga and Her Three Sons (c. 1539–1540) – Oil on panel, 128 x 97 cm, Museo del Prado, Madrid

See also
 Self-portrait in a Convex Mirror (book)

Notes

References

Hartt, Frederick, History of Italian Renaissance Art, (2nd edn.)1987, Thames & Hudson (US Harry N Abrams), 
Parmigianino, Cecil Gould. 
Parmigianino: The Paintings, Mary Vaccaro. 
Parmigianino: The Drawings, Sylvie Beguin et al. 
The Story of Art, E.H. Gombrich, London : Phaidon Press, Ltd., 1995 
Parmigianino and European Mannerism Kunsthistorisches Museum Vienna in English

External links

Parmigianino's biography, style and artworks
Parmigianino Biography at the National Gallery
Parmigianino Gallery at MuseumSyndicate
Prints & People: A Social History of Printed Pictures, an exhibition catalog from The Metropolitan Museum of Art (fully available online as PDF), which contains material on Parmigianino (see index)

Italian etchers
16th-century Italian painters
Italian male painters
Artists from Parma
Mannerist painters
1503 births
1540 deaths
Catholic painters
Catholic etchers